The 2013–14 season was Barnsley's eighth consecutive season in the Championship since promotion in 2006.

Kit

|
|

Championship data

League table

Result summary

Result by round

Squad

Statistics

|-
|colspan="14"|Players who left the club during the season:

|}

Captains
As of 30 November 2013

Goalscorers
As of 3 May 2014

Disciplinary record
As of 3 May 2014

Suspensions served
As of 1 January 2014

Contracts
As of 30 June 2014

Transfers
As of 29 June 2014

In

Loans In

Out

Loans Out

Fixtures & results

Pre-season

Championship

League Cup

FA Cup

Overall summary

Summary
As 3 May 2014

Score overview
As 3 May 2014

References

2013-14
2013–14 Football League Championship by team